The InterCity Express was a class of electric multiple units manufactured by Walkers, Maryborough for Queensland Rail in 1988/89. They were built to operate the Spirit of Capricorn service on the North Coast line service between Brisbane and Rockhampton. Since being superseded on this service, they were used on Sunshine Coast line services from Brisbane to Gympie North until mid-2021. As of November 2021, all units have been retired from service.

History
To operate the Spirit of Capricorn between Brisbane and Rockhampton on the North Coast line that was in the process of being electrified, in 1987 Queensland Rail ordered 16 electric multiple unit carriages from Walkers. They were to be eight semi-permanently coupled pairs of a driving motor car (EMD) and a non-driving motor car (EMM) that were planned to operate as four-carriage sets. Electrical equipment was provided by ASEA (later ABB). In 1988 an additional four trailer cars (EMT) were ordered to allow the sets to be built up to five or six carriages.

The first trials were conducted in May 1988, before the first entered service on Sunshine Coast line services from Brisbane to Nambour, operating in multiple with Electric Multiple Units. On 5 February 1989, they began to operate through to Gympie North. On 3 July 1989, they began to operate Spirit of Capricorn services to Rockhampton.

In 1998, the faster Electric Tilt Train replaced most Spirit of Capricorn services, with a Saturdays only service continuing. They briefly operated on the Gold Coast line following its extension to Nerang in May 1998 and Robina in November 1998. They were used on the Corinda-Yeerongpilly line from January 2000 after the withdrawal of the Queensland Railways 2000 class rail motor.

In 2001, all were fitted with power operated equipment to close the doors. With the withdrawal of the remaining Spirit of Capricorn service from May 2003, they ceased operating north of Gympie North.

All were to be eventually replaced by the New Generation Rollingstock with the first withdrawn in January 2019. By February 2020, only units 153 and 157 were at North Ipswich Railway Workshops in storage. As of November 2021, all ICE units have been retired from operations. The future of these units is currently unknown.

Fleet details

Each half-set numbered 151-158, comprised a semi-permanently coupled driving motor car (EMD) and a non-driving motor car (EMM) that could be built up to five or six carriages with the addition of trailer cars (EMT). In their latter years they generally operated as five car sets. In November 1990 an eight car set was operated.

Named carriages
Driving motor cars 5155 and 5156 were named City of Brisbane and City of Rockhampton to mark the commencement of the Spirit of Capricorn service in July 1989.

References

External links

Specifications

Electric multiple units of Queensland
Queensland Rail City network
Train-related introductions in 1988
25 kV AC multiple units
Walkers Limited multiple units